Nick Cave i Przyjaciele : W Moich Ramionach is a live album recorded in 1999 in Poland. The performances are Nick Cave songs with lyrics translated into Polish by Roman Kołakowski. Cave appears on the 1st and 10th tracks with Stanisław Soyka, also known as Stanisław Sojka.

Track listing
Performers are listed in parenthesis
"Into My Arms" (Stanisław Soyka and Nick Cave)
"Saint Huck" (Mariusz Lubomski)
"Henry Lee" (Anna Maria Jopek and Maciek Maleńczuk)
"The Carny" (A. Matysiak)
"Red Right Hand" (Wojciech Waglewski)
"The Curse of Millhaven" (Kinga Preis)
"O'Malley's Bar" (M. Drężek)
"The Mercy Seat" (Kazik Staszewski)
"Where the Wild Roses Grow" (Anna Maria Jopek and Maciek Maleńczuk)
"The Weeping Song" (Stanisław Soyka and Nick Cave)

References

Collaborative albums
Nick Cave live albums
Polish-language live albums
1999 live albums